Gabriela Dabrowski and Giuliana Olmos defeated Nicole Melichar-Martinez and Ellen Perez in the final, 6–4, 6–4 to win the doubles tennis title at the 2022 Pan Pacific Open.

Chan Hao-ching and Latisha Chan were the defending champions from when the tournament was last held in 2019, but they competed with different partners. However, both lost to the team of Melichar-Martinez and Perez; Hao-ching lost in the first round alongside Shuko Aoyama and Latisha lost in the quarterfinals alongside Alexa Guarachi.

Seeds

Draw

Draw

References

External links 
Draw

Toray Pan Pacific Open - Doubles
2022 Doubles